Tricypha rosenbergi is a moth in the family Erebidae. It was described by Walter Rothschild in 1910. It is found in Ecuador.

References

Moths described in 1910
Phaegopterina
Moths of South America